Pakorn Chatborirak (born August 20, 1984 in Thailand), nickname Boy, is a Thai model, actor attached to Channel 3 and pharmacist.

Early life and education 
Pakorn was born in Bangkok to a Thai family of Teochew background, having two younger brothers, Thana and Pat. His mother was from Ang Thong Province and his father died when he was a child.

Having graduated from Pongpoowadol Kindergarten, Pakorn attended Assumption School, Triam Udom Suksa School, and Faculty of Pharmaceutical Sciences, Chulalongkorn University, earning a bachelor's degree of Science in Pharmacy. His first job was a licensed pharmacist in Bangkok.

Career
Starting as a photograph on magazine, later Pakorn received the CLEO Most Eligible Bachelor 2008 Award. His first movie was 4 Romance part of "SHY." His first drama was Fai Ruk Arsoon on Channel 3. Later he became best known for his lead roles in Wayupak Montra and Roy-Marn dramas. He had photographs on magazine, movie, commercial, music video, stage, voice of an animated cartoon.

Filmography

Films

Television dramas

Short dramas

Singles

MC
 Television 
 20 : On Air 

 Online 
 2018 : Khon Dee Tee Nhai On Air YouTube:KhonDeeTeeNhai Official With Premmanat Suwannanon, Warintorn Panhakarn, Teeradetch Metawarayut, Teeradetch Metawarayut, Jirayu Tangsrisuk

Awards and nominations

Personal life
He is a fan of Korean singer Yuri Kwon.

References

External links

 
  

1984 births
Living people
Pakorn Chatborirak
Pakorn Chatborirak
Pakorn Chatborirak
Pakorn Chatborirak
Pakorn Chatborirak
Pakorn Chatborirak
Pakorn Chatborirak
Pakorn Chatborirak
Pakorn Chatborirak
Thai television personalities
Pakorn Chatborirak
Pakorn Chatborirak